FC Dynamo Lviv is an amateur Ukrainian football club from Lviv, Lviv Oblast.

Created in 1940, the club for most of its history stayed amateur. In 1946 its best players joined FC Spartak Lviv. The club reached the semifinals in the 1998–99 Ukrainian Amateur Cup. In 1999-2002 the club played at the professional level in the Ukrainian Second League.

Notable players
 Kazimierz Gorski

League and cup history

{|class="wikitable"
|-bgcolor="#efefef"
! Season
! Div.
! Pos.
! Pl.
! W
! D
! L
! GS
! GA
! P
!Domestic Cup
!colspan=2|Europe
!Notes
|}

See also

 
Amateur football clubs in Ukraine
Football clubs in Lviv
Association football clubs established in 1940
1940 establishments in Ukraine
Police association football clubs in Ukraine
Dynamo (Ukraine)